Prudencio Alfaro Menéndez (1861 – 23 December 1915) was a Salvadoran politician who served as Vice President of El Salvador from 1895 until 1898. He later led a joint Honduran-Nicaraguan invasion of El Salvador in 1907.

Early life 

Prudencio Alfaro Menéndez was born in 1861 in Jutiapa, Guatemala. His father was Manuel Alfaro and his mother was Andrea Menéndez. He attended the University of El Salvador where he completed his bachelor's degree and doctorate in the Faculty of Political and Social Sciences.

Political career 

In 1885, he participated in a revolution which overthrew Salvadoran President Rafael Zaldívar, and after which, he was elected as a deputy to the Legislative Assembly of El Salvador from Ahuachapán. He opposed the government of President Carlos Ezeta, who deposed President Francisco Menéndez in 1890, and in 1894, he participated in the Revolution of the 44 which deposed Ezeta and installed Rafael Antonio Gutiérrez as president.

In the 1895 Salvadoran presidential election, Gutiérrez was the only candidate and won 61,080 votes. For Vice President, the race was between Alfaro, Carlos Meléndez, and four other politicians, and Alfaro won with 38,006 votes accounting for 62.51 percent of the vote. He assumed office on 1 March 1895.

Both Gutiérrez and Alfaro were deposed on 13 November 1898 by Tomás Regalado. Alfaro sought to regain power and fought Regalado at two battles in Ilobasco and Sensuntepeque, however, he lost both battles and fled for exile in Honduras.

1907 invasion of El Salvador 

On 11 June 1907, Alfaro was one of the leaders of a joint Honduran-Nicaraguan invasion of El Salvador against President Fernando Figueroa. During the invasion, another leader, Manuel Rivas, raided a bank in Acajutla for $20,000 in silver, which led to a personal disagreement between Alfaro and Rivas on how to continue the invasion. Rivas proposed that the two split control of the country, with Rivas controlling the east from San Salvador and Alfaro controlling everything west of San Salvador, however, Alfaro rejected the proposal. After Figueroa personally led an army to engage with Alfaro and Rivas, the two ordered their armies to retreat, effectively ending the War of 1907.

Later years and death 

Alfaro stood for election for the presidency in 1911 but only received one vote. Alfaro was allowed to return to El Salvador in 1911 when Manuel Enrique Araujo became president, however, he was accused of being involved in Araujo's assassination in 1913, and again left the country. He again returned to El Salvador in 1915 when Carlos Meléndez became president.

Alfaro died in San Salvador on 23 December 1915.

Personal life 

He married Carmen Castellanos.

See also 

Rafael Antonio Gutiérrez

References

Citations

Bibliography 

1861 births
1915 deaths
Vice presidents of El Salvador
People from Jutiapa Department
University of El Salvador alumni